Theodore Elwood "Toby" Greene (March 29, 1899 – October 2, 1967) was an American college baseball coach, most notable for leading the Oklahoma State Cowboys baseball team to the national championship in the 1959 College World Series.

Early life
Greene was born in 1899 at Humphrey, in Sullivan County, Missouri but moved with his parents to Thomas, Oklahoma in 1902. He enrolled at Phillips University in Enid, Oklahoma in 1918, where he enlisted in the Student Army Training Corps, a World War I program. Greene later became a multi-sport athlete, excelling in baseball and football for the Haymakers.  He graduated from Phillips in 1924 after playing alongside future New York Giants coach Steve Owen.

Coaching career
Greene began his coaching career in 1924 as a baseball coach at Sayre High School in Sayre, Oklahoma. He remained there for two years before moving to Bartlesville High School in Bartlesville, Oklahoma for one year. He then became all-sports coach at Phillips.

Greene later coached at Oklahoma City University before becoming a football assistant at Oklahoma A&M in 1939. In 1942, he added head baseball coach to his duties. Greene coached the team for 22 seasons, only one of which saw a record below .500. Greene earned seven district championships and eight conference titles to go with his national championship in 1959.

Death
Greene died on October 3, 1967, at his home in Stillwater, Oklahoma.

Head coaching record

College football

College baseball
The following table depicts Greene's record as a head coach.

References

External links
 

1899 births
1967 deaths
Oklahoma City Chiefs football coaches
Oklahoma City Stars baseball coaches
Oklahoma City Stars men's basketball coaches
Oklahoma State Cowboys baseball coaches
Oklahoma State Cowboys football coaches
Phillips Haymakers baseball coaches
Phillips Haymakers baseball players
Phillips Haymakers football coaches
Phillips Haymakers football players
High school baseball coaches in the United States
High school football coaches in Oklahoma
People from Sullivan County, Missouri
Coaches of American football from Oklahoma
Players of American football from Oklahoma
Baseball coaches from Oklahoma
Baseball players from Oklahoma
Basketball coaches from Oklahoma